The Richardson Mountains are a mountain range located west of the mouth of the Mackenzie River in northern Yukon, Canada. They parallel the northernmost part of the boundary between Yukon and Northwest Territories.

Although some sources consider the Richardson Mountains to be part of the Canadian Rockies, the common northern limit of the Canadian Rockies is the Liard River, which is a long way south. The Richardson Mountains are a sub-range of the Brooks Range which lies mostly in Alaska.

See also
List of mountain ranges of Canada
Albert Johnson (criminal)

References

Mountain ranges of Yukon
Brooks Range